The Assembly of First Nations Quebec-Labrador (AFNQL) is a political organization representing the First Nations of Quebec and Labrador. It represents these First Nations to the Secrétariat aux affaires autochtones du Québec and to the ministry of Crown-Indigenous Relations and Northern Affairs of Canada. The AFNQL is composed of representatives from 43 communities in the Abenaki, Algonquin, Atikamekw, Cree, Maliseet, Mi'kmaq, Innu, Huron-Wendat and Naskapi nations, as well as from the Mohawks. The AFNQL does not represent the Inuit or any Inuit community; they are represented by Inuit Tapiriit Kanatami.

The Assembly meets about 4 times a year to give mandates to its Bureau and to the Commissions it has set up. From 1985 to 1992, the elected chief of the Assembly was Konrad Sioui. Since 1992 it has been . The AFNQL is attached to the Assembly of First Nations (AFN) whose office is located in Ottawa. The chief of the AFNQL is a member of the AFN executive and can be appointed as the bearer of national files (ex. international, education, health, finance, etc.).

Members
There are 43 communities that are members of the AFNQL.

Saint Lawrence Iroquians
Huron-Wendat

Mohawk

Mohawks of Kahnawà:ke
Mohawks of Kanesatake

Eastern Algonquians
Abenaki
()

Odanak

Malecite

Mi'kmaq
(Mi'gmawei Mawiomi Secretariat)
Listuguj Miꞌgmaq First Nation
Micmacs of Gesgapegiag

Northern Algonquians
Atikamekw
(Conseil de la Nation Atikamekw)
Conseil des Atikamekw de Manawan
Conseil des Atikamekw d’Opitciwan
Conseil des Atikamekw de Wemotaci

Cree (Grand Council of the Crees)
Cree Nation of Chisasibi
Cree Nation of Eastmain
Cree Nation of Nemaska
Cree Nation of Mistissini
Cree Nation of Oujé-Bougoumou
Cree Nation of Waswanipi
Cree Nation of Wemindji

Cree Nation of Whapmagoostui

Naskapi
Naskapi Nation of Kawawachikamach

Innu 
Natuashish and
Sheshatshiu in Labrador
Conseil des Innus d'Ekuanitshit
Conseil des Innus de Essipit
Conseil des Innus de Matimekush-Lac John
Conseil des Innus de Pakuashipi
Conseil des Innus de Pessamit
Conseil des Innus de Nutashkuan

Innu Takuaikan Uashat mak Mani-Utenam
Pekuakamiulnuatsh First Nation
Mushuau Innu Band Council

Central Algonquians
( and )
Algonquins of Barriere Lake
Conseil de la Première Nation Abitibiwinni
Conseil des anicinape de Kitcisakik
Kebaowek First Nation
Kitigan Zibi Anishinabeg
Long Point First Nation

See also
Assembly of First Nations
Inuit Tapiriit Kanatami

References
This article has been partially translated from its French counterpart: Assemblée des Premières Nations du Québec et du Labrador.  

Indigenous peoples in Canada
Indigenous peoples in Quebec
Indigenous peoples in Newfoundland and Labrador
Political organizations
Politics of Quebec
Politics of Newfoundland and Labrador
Indigenous rights organizations